The Akaflieg Karlsruhe AK-5b is a single-seat club class glider designed and built in Germany by members of Akaflieg Karlsruhe.

Design and development
Poor handling characteristics of the AK5 prompted Akaflieg Karlsruhe to design a successor with improved handling capable of being used as a first single-seater at the Akaflieg Karlsruhe gliding club. During development of the AK-5b it was decided to make changes to the construction by using carbon-fibre, aramid fibres and glass-fibre. As part of the re-design, a new cockpit was designed with new crash-worthy canopy, equipped with a new opening and emergency release mechanisms

Specification (AK-5b)

References

External links
Akaflieg Karlsruhe 
Akaflieg Karlsruhe homepage

1990s German sailplanes
Akaflieg Karlsruhe aircraft
T-tail aircraft
Aircraft first flown in 1996